Christina Stead (17 July 190231 March 1983) was an Australian novelist and short-story writer acclaimed for her satirical wit and penetrating psychological characterisations. Christina Stead was a committed Marxist, although she was never a member of the Communist Party. She spent much of her life outside Australia, although she returned before her death.

Biography
Christina Stead's father was the marine biologist and pioneer conservationist David George Stead. She was born in the Sydney suburb of Rockdale. They lived in Rockdale at Lydham Hall. She later moved with her family to the suburb of Watsons Bay in 1911. She was the only child of her father's first marriage, and had five half-siblings from his second marriage. He also married a third time, to Thistle Yolette Harris, the Australian botanist, educator, author, and conservationist. According to some, this house was a hellhole for her because of her "domineering" father. She then left Australia in 1928, and worked in a Parisian bank from 1930 to 1935. Stead also became involved with the writer, broker and Marxist political economist William J. Blake (formerly Wilhelm Blech), with whom she travelled to Spain (leaving at the outbreak of the Spanish Civil War) and to the USA. They married in 1952, once Blake was able to obtain a divorce from his previous wife. It was after his death from stomach cancer in 1968 that she returned to Australia. Indeed, Stead only returned to Australia after she was denied the Britannica-Australia prize on the grounds that she had "ceased to be an Australian."

Stead wrote 12 novels and several volumes of short stories in her lifetime. She taught "Workshop in the Novel" at New York University in 1943 and 1944, and also worked as a Hollywood screenwriter in the 1940s, contributing to the Madame Curie biopic and the John Ford and John Wayne war movie, They Were Expendable. Her first novel, Seven Poor Men of Sydney (1934), dealt with the lives of radicals and dockworkers, but she was not a practitioner of social realism. Stead's best-known novel, titled The Man Who Loved Children, is largely based on her own childhood, and was first published in 1940. It was not until the poet Randall Jarrell wrote the introduction for a new American edition in 1965 and her New York publisher convinced her to change the setting from Sydney to Washington, that the novel began to receive a larger audience. In 2005, the magazine Time included this work in their "100 Best Novels from 1923–2005," and in 2010 American author Jonathan Franzen hailed the novel as a "masterpiece" in The New York Times. Stead's Letty Fox: Her Luck, often regarded as an equally fine novel, was officially banned in Australia for several years because it was considered amoral and salacious.

Stead set her only British novel, Cotters' England, partly in Gateshead (called Bridgehead in the novel). She was in Newcastle upon Tyne in the summer of 1949, accompanied by her friend Anne Dooley (née Kelly), a local woman, who was the model for Nellie Cotter, the extraordinary heroine of the book. Anne was no doubt responsible for Stead's reasonable attempt at conveying the local accent. Her letters indicate that she had taken on Tyneside speech and become deeply concerned with the people around her. The American title of the book is Dark Places of the Heart.

Stead died in hospital at Balmain, Sydney, in 1983, aged 80. Her former home in Pacific Street, Watsons Bay, was the first site chosen for the Woollahra Council Plaque Scheme, which was launched in 2014 with the aim of honouring significant people who had lived in the area covered by Woollahra Council. A plaque was installed on the footpath outside Stead's former home.

Works

Novels

 Seven Poor Men of Sydney (1934)
 The Beauties and Furies (1936)
 House of All Nations (1938)
 The Man Who Loved Children (1940)
 For Love Alone (1945)
 Letty Fox: Her Luck (1946)
 A Little Tea, a Little Chat (1948)
 The People with the Dogs (1952)
 Dark Places of the Heart (1966) (aka Cotters' England)
 The Little Hotel (1973)
 Miss Herbert (The Suburban Wife) (1976)
 I'm Dying Laughing: The Humourist (1986)

Short stories
 The Salzburg Tales (1934)
 The Puzzleheaded Girl: Four Novellas (1965) (containing The Puzzleheaded Girl, The Dianas, The Rightangled Creek and Girl from the Beach)
 A Christina Stead Reader (1978) edited by Jean B. Read
 Ocean of Story: The Uncollected Stories of Christina Stead, edited by R. G. Geering (1985)

Letters
 Web of Friendship: Selected letters, 1928–1973, edited by R.G. Geering (1992)
 Talking into the Typewriter: Selected letters, 1973–1983, edited by R.G. Geering (1992)
 Dearest Munx: The Letters of Christina Stead and William J. Blake, edited by Margaret Harris (2006)

Translations
 In balloon and Bathyscaphe by Auguste Piccard (1955)
 Colour of Asia by Fernando Gigon (1956)

Further reading
Ackland, Michael. Christina Stead and the Socialist Heritage New York: Cambria Press, 2016
Emmerson, Darryl.   I Write What I See; Christina Stead Speaks (play) produced Melbourne 2010 www.iwritewhatisee.com
Joseph, Maria. "Gargantuan Texts: Bakhtinian Theory in Dialogue with Six of Christina Stead's Novels." PhD thesis, University of Adelaide, 1997.
Morrison, Fiona. Christina Stead and the Matter of America (2019) 
Pender, Anne. Christina Stead, Satirist (2002) 
 Peterson, Teresa. The Enigmatic Christina Stead: A Provocative Re-Reading (2001)  Review
 Rowley, Hazel. Christina Stead: A Biography  The Miegunyah Press, 1993, 2nd 2007 
 Williams, Chris. Christina Stead: A Life of Letters (1989)

Quotes

References

External links

 The Character and Situation of Christina Stead. Radio documentary by Catherine Gough-Brady made from archives of Stead speaking, and excerpts from Stead's lectures on how to write a novel.
 Christina Stead Centenary Essays at Journal of the Association for the Study of Australian Literature
 Jonathan Franzen on The Man Who Loved Children in The New York Times Book Review
 "The night of which no one speaks": Christina Stead's art as struggle by Susan Lever, Journal of the South Pacific Association for Commonwealth Literature and Language Studies Number 37 (1993)
 
 Annotated bibliography and biographical sketch by Perry Middlemiss
 Stead's plaque on the Sydney Writers Walk
 
 Unveiling of plaque at Christina Stead home, Watsons Bay

1902 births
1983 deaths
Marxist writers
New York University faculty
Writers from Sydney
Patrick White Award winners
Australian communists
Australian women novelists
Australian women short story writers
20th-century Australian women writers
20th-century Australian novelists
20th-century Australian short story writers
Watsons Bay, New South Wales